Pickering (2021 population 99,186) is a city located in Southern Ontario, Canada, immediately east of Toronto in Durham Region.

Beginning in the 1770s, the area was settled by primarily ethnic British colonists. An increase in population occurred after the American Revolutionary War, when the Crown resettled Loyalists and encouraged new immigration. Many of the smaller rural communities have been preserved and function as provincially significant historic sites and museums. The city also includes the development of Durham Live, a multi-billion-dollar casino complex.

History

Early period
The present-day Pickering was Aboriginal territory for thousands of years. The Wyandot (called the Huron by Europeans), who spoke an Iroquoian language, were the historical people living here in the 15th century. Archeological remains of a large village have been found here, known as the Draper Site. Later, the Wyandot moved northwest to Georgian Bay, where they established their historic homeland. There they encountered French explorers in the early 17th century, followed by missionaries and fur traders.

The first recorded history of this area was made in 1669, when the French Jesuit missionary François de Salignac de la Mothe-Fénelon noted reaching what he called the Seneca (more likely the Onondaga) village of Gandatsetiagon, on the shores of Frenchman's Bay (for whom it would be named). The Onondaga (and the Seneca) were among the Five Nations of the Iroquois Confederacy. The Onondaga (and other Iroquois) generally occupied territory to the south and west of Lakes Ontario and Erie in present-day New York that extended into Pennsylvania and the Ohio Valley, where they maintained hunting grounds. (The Seneca were located farther west, near Seneca Lake, among the Finger Lakes. Fenelon wintered at the village and started missionary work with this people.)

Township of Pickering

The British took over Canada in 1763 following defeat of the French in the Seven Years' War, known in Colonial America as the French and Indian War. They likely completed survey of the township about 1776. British colonial settlers were steadily migrating into the area from eastern areas of Canada. There is some controversy over the identity of the earliest European settler in the area. One of the candidates is Mike Duffin, who settled in what later became the Pickering Village (now in Ajax), possibly in the 1770s. The other candidate is Benjamin Wilson of Vermont, who probably lived in Pickering for sometime, before moving to Whitby in 1794.

In the 1780s, the present-day Pickering area was a part of the Nassau District of the Province of Quebec. In 1791, Augustus Jones undertook a survey of the area, establishing the baseline and some of the concessions. The same year, the District was transferred to the newly created province of Upper Canada. In 1792, the district was renamed Home District, and Pickering was established as a township.

The township was originally called "Edinburgh" but in 1792 was renamed after Pickering, North Yorkshire. Pickering Village, now part of Ajax, emerged as the major population and commercial centre of the Pickering Township in the early 19th century. The conversion of a local trail into the Kingston Road in 1799 contributed greatly to the increased settlement in the area. In 1807, Quakers led by Timothy Rogers settled in the area, and by 1809, the population of Pickering Township consisted of 180 people, most of whom lived along the Duffins Creek. In 1811, the Pickering Township became a separate municipality. Several sawmills, gristmills, taverns, and other businesses operated in the area. During the War of 1812, the maintenance of the Kingston Road improved because of the increased military traffic and further contributed to the development of the area.

In the 19th century, several other small communities developed in the Duffins Creek watershed, within the Pickering Township. These included Whitevale, Brougham, Green River, Claremont, Altona, Greenwood, and Balsam. A few communities also developed in the smaller Carruthers Creek watershed, including Audley (now part of Ajax), Kinsale, and Salem. In 1849, the village of Dunbarton was established along the Dunbarton Creek. The Grand Trunk Railway reached the Township in 1856.

Pickering was represented in the Mackenzie Rebellion of 1837. One of its leaders, Peter Matthews, had been one of the most prominent members of the community. In 1851, the Pickering Township was severed from the York County, and became a part of the newly established Ontario County.

In the later decades of the 19th century, a fall in the demand for wheat led to economic decline in the primarily-agricultural township. The township lost over 40% of its population in the second half of the 19th century, and the decline continued in the first half of the 20th century.

In the first half of the 20th cenutry, two new communities emerged in the Pickering Township: the cottage community of Pickering Beach and the self-contained community around the federal government-owned Defence Industries Limited Pickering Works munitions plant. Both areas are now part of Ajax. After the World War II, urbanization began in the southern part of Pickering, and later spread to other parts of the Township.

City of Pickering
On 1 January 1974, the Ontario County was dissolved, and the area became part of the Regional Municipality of Durham. The southeastern portion of the Pickering Township, including the Pickering Village and Pickering High School, became part of the independent town of Ajax. The rest of the township became the Town of Pickering, which in 2000, became the City of Pickering.

In the last quarter of the 20th century, much of the government-owned land in northern Pickering sat idle because of uncertainty over the proposed Pickering Airport. That included the land expropriated by the federal government for the airport and the adjacent land expropriated by the provincial government for the proposed Seaton community that would benefit from the airport.

The development of Seaton picked up pace in the 21st century, but as of 2022, only 1,549 of the 20,989 planned units had been built. The city also considered the development of a new community called Veraine, to be built in northeastern Pickering. The city also saw a rise in the number of high-rise condos.

Geography

The city covers an area of 231 square kilometres (89 sq mi) with an elevation of 89 metres (292 ft).

Toronto, Markham, and Rouge Park border Pickering on the west; Ajax and Whitby border Pickering on the east; Uxbridge is to the north; and Lake Ontario forms Pickering's southern boundary.

Communities
The southern part of the city is mainly suburban, with industrial areas restricted to the area around Pickering Nuclear Generating Station. Most of the suburban areas were built as subdivisions after World War II, starting in the area around Frenchman's Bay. Prior to the war, the few suburban areas in the township were the communities of Dunbarton, Fairport Beach, Liverpool Market, and Rouge Hill. Squires Beach, located by the lakeshore in the southeast part of the city, is now a ghost town as the area was cleared from 1966 to make way for the construction of the Pickering Nuclear Generating Station. The only home standing in Squires Beach was built by Timothy Rogers in 1842 and relocated to Montgomery Park Road. Squires Beach Road is now cut off from the lake by a waste water treatment plant.

The northern part of the municipality is mainly rural, primarily used for agricultural purposes. However, a number of residential developments are found in this area, and the locally controversial Seaton area also falls within this part of the city. The primary rural communities in Pickering are Claremont, Brougham, and Whitevale; a number of smaller communities exist throughout northern Pickering, such as Greenwood. John Diefenbaker, a Prime Minister of Canada, lived in Greenwood for a number of years.

The abandoned ghost town of Altona is located there. Cherrywood, another hamlet in Pickering, is one of the few areas that are protected within the Greenbelt.

The communities of Kinsale in the northeast and Green River on the York-Durham town line are other small communities in Pickering, with a population each of between 50 and 100 people. Most of these communities were founded in the 1700s and 1800s and have churches and historic estates that have been restored through government funding. Dixie is a small rural community situated in rural Pickering, with more contemporary buildings.

The film industry has been very active in communities such as Whitevale, since the 1980s, due to the quality of the historical buildings and untouched nature of the landscape. The television shows Hannibal (2013–2015) Suits (2011–2019), and American Gods (2017) have filmed extensively in Whitevale and in other locations in Pickering.

Nautical Village is located at Frenchman's Bay and features entertainment, a playground, a boardwalk, restaurants, shops and an art gallery.

The city is divided into following neighbourhoods:

 South Urban Pickering
 Rosebank
 West Shore
 Bay Ridges
 Brock Industrial
 Rougemount
 Woodlands
 Dunbarton
 City Centre
 Village East, the eastern part of the former Pickering Village municipality
 Highbush
 Amberlea
 Brock Ridge
 Liverpool
 Rouge Park
 Duffin Heights
 Seaton Urban Area
 Lamoureaux
 Brock-Taunton
 Mount Pleasant
 Wilson Meadows
 Thompson's Corners
 Innovation Corridor
 Rural Pickering
 Claremont & Area
 Greenwood, Kinsale & Estate Residential Clusters
 Other Rural Area

Demographics

The city has estimated that by 2031, Pickering will be home to 131,608 residents.

In 2021, 16.5% of the population was under 15 years of age, and 16.6% was 65 years and over. The median age in Pickering was 40.8 years.

Immigrants made up 36.3% of the population in 2021. The top places of birth of the immigrant population were India (11.2%), Sri Lanka (8.2%), Pakistan (7.9%), Philippines (7.5%), Jamaica (7.2%), the United Kingdom (7.0%), Guyana (6.6%), Trinidad and Tobago (3.7%), China (2.7%), Bangladesh (2.5%), Afghanistan (2.4%), and the United States (1.7%).

The median total income of households in 2020 for Pickering was $118,000.

Ethnicity 
As per the 2021 census, the most common ethnic or cultural origins in Pickering are English (14.0%), Irish (11.5%), Scottish (11.0%), Canadian (10.6%), Indian (9.6%),  Italian (5.6%), German (5.0%), Jamaican (4.3%), Filipino (4.3%), Chinese (3.9%), British Isles (3.6%), Pakistani (3.5%), Sri Lankan (3.3%), and French (3.3%). Indigenous people made up 1.1% of the population, mostly First Nations (0.5%) and Métis (0.5%). Ethnocultural backgrounds in the town included European (47.0%), South Asian (21.2%), Black (11.4%), Filipino (4.1%), Chinese (3.0%), West Asian (2.1%), Arab (1.7%), and Latin American (1.5%).

Note: Totals greater than 100% due to multiple origin responses.

Religion 
In 2021, 53.7% of the population identified as Christian, with Catholics (25.7%) making up the largest denomination, followed by Anglican (3.9%), Orthodox (3.8%), United Church (3.0%), and other denominations. 23.2% of the population reported no religious affiliation. Others identified as Muslim (12.6%), Hindu (8.3%), Sikh (0.8%), Buddhist (0.5%), and with other religions.

Language 
The 2021 census found English to be the mother tongue of 69.2% of the population. This was followed by Urdu (3.1%), Tamil (3.0%), Tagalog (1.8%), Arabic (1.2%), Spanish (1.1%), French (1.1%), Italian (1.0%), Gujarati (1.0%), Dari (0.9%), Mandarin (0.8%), and Cantonese (0.8%). Of the official languages, 98.6% of the population reported knowing English and 7.3% French.

Economy

Pickering is home to the Pickering Nuclear Generating Station, an eight-reactor facility with a capacity of 4,120 megawatts. The first station, Pickering A, opened with four reactors in 1971. Ontario Power Generation, the plants' operator, is the largest single employer in the city. In 2001, the wind-powered OPG 7 Commemorative Turbine was opened on the generating station site. The nuclear power plant is expected to start decommissioning in 2024.

A number of manufacturers are also located in the city. Major employers include Yorkville Sound (audio equipment), the Canadian headquarters of Purdue Pharma (pharmaceuticals and health & beauty products), Hubbell Canada (electrical equipment), PSB Speakers – Lenbrook (stereo equipment) and Eco-Tec Inc. (industrial water purification and chemical recovery systems).

Pickering is a founding member of the Durham Strategic Energy Alliance or DSEA. The nucleus of the DSEA is primarily Pickering businesses, such as Ontario Power Generation, Veridian, Siemens/Trench, Tetra Tech WEI, AECL, Intellimeter, Areva and Eco-Tec Inc.

Other notable organizations with headquarters in Pickering include: Municipal Property Assessment Corporation. MPAC performs value assessment for property tax purposes for all municipalities in Ontario. In 2012 Search Engine People, Canada's largest Internet-marketing company, moved to Pickering's downtown. The International Institute of Business Analysis is also headquartered in Pickering.

In 2006, Profit magazine recognized Pickering as one of the top 10 cities in Canada for growing a business.

In 2013, the Region of Durham released its Business Count (Employment Survey), which indicated that Pickering has the most jobs amongst Durham Region municipalities, with 29,000+ positions. This figure represents a near 1/3 ratio of jobs to residents.

With the implementation of Seaton and downtown intensification, the Province of Ontario's planning anticipates the creation of 40,000 new jobs for Pickering over the next two decades.

Pickering has planned a downtown intensification program, which includes new condominium developments around the Pickering GO station and Pickering Town Centre. Pickering Town Centre is a two-story mall located in Pickering. An enclosed pedestrian bridge constructed over the 14 lanes of highway 401 was a recent development that has contributed to Pickering's push for more density downtown. The project Durham Live in south Pickering received approval for construction in 2017. It will include a water park, film studio, five star hotel, performing arts theater and possibly a casino.

Government

The city council consists of a mayor, three regional councillors, and three city councillors. The mayor and regional councillors sit on the council and also represent the city at Durham Regional Council. The city councillors sit on city council only. Pickering is divided into three wards of roughly equal population, with one city councillor and one regional councillor elected to represent each ward, in what are known as single-member districts.

The current mayor, Kevin Ashe, has held the mayoralty since 2022.

Infrastructure

Transportation

Transit service began in Pickering with the Bay Shores dial-a-bus, which began in 1970–1973. In 2001 Pickering Transit merged with former Ajax Transit to form the Ajax-Pickering Transit Authority (APTA). In 2006, the regional transit system Durham Region Transit took over operations in the Durham Regional Municipality.

The Pickering GO station offers public rail transit on an east–west axis. In 2012, Pickering's landmark bridge opened – connecting the Pickering GO station to the city's downtown core.

Durham Regional Roads serve the city, north and south. Highway 401 runs near the south end of Pickering and Highway 407 ETR runs through the mid-north of the city.

Pickering Airport was a planned second major airport for the Greater Toronto Area. Lands were expropriated in north Pickering in 1972 but the plan was stopped. As of 2021 no firm plans for the airport exist.

Emergency services
Police services in Pickering are provided by the Durham Regional Police from a division office located in the eastern section of the city. Officers from this location also patrol Ajax.  Pickering Fire Services operates from four stations with a force of all full-time firefighters. Claremont Fire Hall is now fully staffed by full-time firefighters 24 hours a day, seven days a week. Ambulance/emergency medical services are provided by Durham Region.

Education
Pickering is served by the Durham District School Board, the Durham Catholic District School Board, the Conseil scolaire Viamonde and the Conseil scolaire de district catholique Centre-Sud.  As of early 2007, the public board operates 17 elementary schools and two secondary schools, Dunbarton High School and Pine Ridge Secondary School (Pickering High School was previously located in Pickering, but was transferred to Ajax when the city boundaries were changed). The Catholic board runs eight elementary schools and one secondary school, Saint Mary Catholic Secondary School. The French public school board operates École Ronald-Marion, which serves both elementary and secondary students.

Blaisdale Montessori School, a private school chain, has several locations throughout Pickering serving children from preschool age to grade 8. There is also a private elementary and junior high school there called Montessori Learning Centre. Also serving the Durham Region is Durham Secondary Academy and Middle School, an inspected private high school and middle school for grades 5 to 12.

In September 2012, the Durham College/Centennial College Joint Learning Site opened at the north terminus of the pedestrian bridge. The Joint Learning Site offers primarily graduate certificate programs, with a number of complementary courses and classes. At the time of its opening, it was the only public post-secondary institution in the Province of Ontario with a direct connection to public transit.

Gallery

Notable people
 Andy Andreoff, NHL player
 Andrea Lewis, singer, actor and songwriter
 Bree Williamson, actress best known for her role as Jessica Buchanan on soap opera One Life to Live
 Bromley Armstrong, civil rights activist
 Cory Joseph, NBA player for the Sacramento Kings
 Chris Van Vliet, journalist
 Craig Hutchison, Olympic swimmer 
 Dale Goldhawk, journalist and consumer rights advocate
 Daniel David Palmer, the founder of chiropractic
 Denis T. O'Connor, former Roman Catholic archbishop of Toronto
 Drake Caggiula, NHL player
 Ernie Coombs, children's entertainer, better known as Mr. Dressup
 Glenn Clark, former National Lacrosse League player and former head coach of the Toronto Rock
 Glenn Healy, former NHL goalie, member of 1994 Stanley Cup Champion New York Rangers
 Ilona Duczynska, Polish-Hungarian communist revolutionary, active in Hungary, Austria, England and Canada
 Jaime Peters, professional soccer player who plays midfield for Ipswich Town in the United Kingdom
 Karl Polanyi, professor of economics at Columbia University and author of The Great Transformation
 Kristen Holden-Ried, actor
 Laura Creavalle, Guyanese-born Canadian/American professional bodybuilder
 Manafest, Christian rap rock musician 
 Mark Holland, politician
 Neil Young, rock singer-songwriter, spent part of his early years in Pickering, living on Brock Road
 Nikkita Holder, Olympic track and field athlete
 Paul Peschisolido, professional soccer player who played in England as a striker and was the Manager of Burton Albion F.C.
 Perdita Felicien, Olympic track and field athlete
 Sarah Slean, singer
 Sean Avery, former NHL forward
 Shawn Mendes, singer and songwriter
 Shelley-Ann Brown, Olympic silver-medalist
 Sheri Kershaw, Canadian musician, singer and songwriter
 Spider Jones, former professional boxer, media/radio personality, currently with CFRB radio
 Tony Sharpe, Olympic bronze medalist in the 4 x 100 metre relay at the 1984 Summer Olympics
 Tyler Stewart, Barenaked Ladies drummer/singer 
 Yannick Carter, Canadian Football League linebacker and special teamer for the Hamilton Tiger-Cats

In popular culture

Film
 The 1957 CBC/Hollywood production of the classic television show Hawkeye and the Last of the Mohicans was filmed in Pickering. A farm at the corner of Valley Farm Rd. and 3rd Concession, owned by Arthur Gottlieb, was the setting for the 25-episode series. 
 The 1979 film The Black Stallion was shot at a farm on Sideline 34 in north Pickering near Altona.
 The Canadian television show Paradise Falls first season was filmed in the village of Whitevale, as was David Cronenberg's film The Dead Zone.
 The 1994 comedy The Ref, with Denis Leary and Kevin Spacey, was filmed in part at Port Pickering Marina, on Frenchman's Bay.
 The 1995 family/adventure film Salt Water Moose, starring Timothy Dalton and Lolita Davidovitch, was filmed in and around Frenchman's Bay.
 The 1998 comedy/action film The Big Hit, with Mark Wahlberg, Lou Diamond Phillips, Avery Brooks, Christina Applegate and Elliott Gould, was partly filmed in Pickering near Petticoat Creek.
 The 2003 two-part mini-series Lives of the Saints, based on Nino Ricci's award-winning trilogy co-starring Sophia Loren, filmed scenes on a farm just north of Pickering.
 Pickering Museum Village has been used as a setting in Road to Avonlea, Little Men, and the films Anne of Green Gables and Lantern Hill.
 The final scene in Boondock Saints 2: All Saints' Day was filmed in Pickering.

TV
 A television adaptation of Jack Reacher was partially filmed in North Pickering

See also
List of townships in Ontario

Literature
Wood, William Robertson (1911). Past years in Pickering: Sketches of the History of the Community. Retrieved at the website "Our Roots – Nos Racines", University of Calgary/Université Laval.

Notes

References

External links

 
Cities in Ontario
Lower-tier municipalities in Ontario
Populated places on Lake Ontario in Canada
Populated places established in 1791
1791 establishments in Canada